is the film adaptation of the 2009 Super Sentai Series Samurai Sentai Shinkenger. The film was released in Japanese theaters on August 8, 2009, as a double-bill with the Kamen Rider Decade film Kamen Rider Decade: All Riders vs. Dai-Shocker. Some of its footage was used in the Power Rangers Samurai team up episode "Clash of the Red Rangers - The Movie".

Plot
Taking place in between Shinkenger Acts 24 and 25, the Shinkengers battle the newly revived Kusare Gedoushu Aburame Manpuku and his army for three days. The wounded and tired Shinkengers nearly lose, had the Kusare Gedoushu not needed to regain energy by soaking in the Sanzu River. As their wounds are treated, Jii reveals that he has found the Secret Disk used by the first Shinken Red to seal Manpuku at the Genryu Temple, which lies in the middle of Kusare Gedoushu territory. Using Ryunosuke and Kotoha's plan to sneak in disguised as members of the Nanashi Company, Takeru gets the Founding Secret Disk only to see that it is actually a cryptic message left by the first Shinken Red Shiba Retsudō of obtaining power when facing it. Unable to decipher the riddle, the Shinkengers lose hope until they overhear children praying and decide to face the Kusare Gedoushu without the Disk. The next day, the Shinkengers confront the Kusare Gedoushu once more. The vassals hold off the Kusare Nanashi Company members as Shinken Red battles Manpuku. Elsewhere, not wanting his quarry to die by another's hand, Juzo attempts to join the fray as Genta intervenes and becomes Shinken Gold to fight Juzo. Losing to Manpuku, Shinken Red realizes the meaning behind Retsudō's message as he uses the Secret Disk to break the seal Retsudō placed on Manpuku's body to restore the Disk's full power. This turns it into the Kyoryu Disk and turns Shinken Red into Hyper Shinken Red, and his Shinkenmaru into the Kyoryumaru. With these newfound powers, Hyper Shinken Red single-handedly defeats the Kusare Nanashi before slaying Manpuku. Reviving into giant size, Manpuku opens up into his true form which overpowers Tenku ShinkenOh until the Kyoryumaru transforms into the Kyoryu Origami and bites off the Kusare Gedoshu's snake head before combining with ShinkenOh to form Kyoryu ShinkenOh to destroy Manpuku once and for all.

Cast
Takeru Shiba: 
Ryunosuke Ikenami: 
Mako Shiraishi: 
Chiaki Tani: 
Kotoha Hanaori: 
Genta Umemori: 
Juzo Fuwa: 
Hikoma Kusakabe: 
Shiba Retsudō: 
Older sister: 
Younger brother: 
Manpuku Aburame (Voice): 
Doukoku Chimatsuri (Voice): 
Dayu Usukawa (Voice): 
Shitari of the Bones (Voice): 
Narration, Sushi Changer Voice:

Cast notes

Songs
Ending theme
 
 Lyrics: Shoko Fujibayashi
 Composition: Hideaki Takatori
 Arrangement: Project.R (Hiroaki Kagoshima)
 Artist: Shinkengers (Tori Matsuzaka, Hiroki Aiba, Rin Takanashi, Shogo Suzuki, Suzuka Morita, Keisuke Sohma) & Hideaki Takatori

References

External links
DCD-Shin.jp - Official movie website hub 
Samurai Sentai Shinkenger The Movie: The Fateful War  - Official movie website 

2009 films
2000s Super Sentai films
2009 3D films
Japanese 3D films
3D short films